Dalin may refer to:

 Dalin, Chiayi, a township in Chiayi County, Taiwan
 Dalin Station, a railway station, Chiayi County, Taiwan
 Dalin, Iran, a village in Fars Province, Iran
 Dalin (surname)
 Dalin Tollestrup, Canadian football player, 2011 Edmonton Eskimos season
 Liu Dalin (born 1932), Chinese sexologist
 Wen Dalin (575–637), Tang dynasty politician
 Dalin Myślenice, a Polish women's volleyball team known as "Dalin", based in Myślenice

See also
 Dahlin